The Leo Frigo Memorial Bridge is a bridge on the north side of Green Bay, Wisconsin. It carries Interstate 43 over the Fox River just south of its mouth into Green Bay. Formerly known as the Tower Drive Bridge, it was renamed in 2002 "in recognition and appreciation of Leo Frigo, a civic and philanthropic leader in the Green Bay area.  The bridge opened to traffic in 1981. Because of the bridge's height and slope, it is prone to being shut down during inclement weather. The bridge carries roughly 40,000 vehicles per day as of 2015.

Suicides
As the highest bridge in the Green Bay area, it has been the scene of a number of suicide attempts. On July 19, 2004, a woman was saved by a Wisconsin state trooper, who caught her before she fell to her death. The woman and the state trooper were reunited on The Oprah Winfrey Show. She has since written a book, Why I Jumped, on her experiences. Signs have also been added to the bridge, containing the phone number for a local crisis hotline, with a suicide barrier under consideration as early as 2005, but not yet implemented going into the 2020s.

Sagging

On September 24, 2013, the bridge was closed after a  stretch of the bridge sagged. One pier's footings had settled . The pilings, the pier, and surrounding piers had experienced significant erosion because of the composition of the surrounding soil. The erosion caused the pilings to buckle, leading to the sag. After the incident, the pier and the bridge were fitted with sensors, which have not detected any further movement in the bridge. On January 5, 2014 the bridge was re-opened to traffic. The total cost of repairs was $8.45 million.

Notes

Buildings and structures in Green Bay, Wisconsin
Transportation in Green Bay, Wisconsin
Road bridges in Wisconsin
Bridges on the Interstate Highway System
1981 establishments in Wisconsin
Tied arch bridges in the United States
Bridges completed in 1981